The following is a list containing people both born in Stuttgart and notable residents of the city, ordered chronologically.

Artists

Artists (continued) 

 Hans Schumm (1896–1990), film actor
 Jörg Faerber (1929–2022), conductor 
 Wolfgang Kermer (born 1935), art historian, art pedagogue
 Veronika Bayer (1940–2008), actress
 Eberhard Weber (born 1940), double bassist and composer
 Klaus Zehelein (born 1940), opera intendant
 Wolfgang Kramer (born 1942), board game designer
 Rolf Schübel (born 1942), film director and screenwriter
 Friedman Paul Erhardt (1943–2007), early television chef
 Jerry Zaks (born 1946), stage and television director and actor
 Andrea Rau (born 1947), actress and producer
 Anna Thomas (born 1948), film screenwriter, film producer and writer
 Manfred Wagner (born 1948), author of Wagner model
 Hermann Kopp (born 1954), composer and musician
 Horst von Saurma (born 1954), chief editor of the German automobile magazine Sport auto
 Jeff Dahl (born 1955), musician
 Roland Emmerich (born 1955), film director, screenwriter and producer
 Ralf Illenberger (born 1956), guitarist
 Peter Schilling (born 1956), synthpop musician
 Kiddy Citny (born 1957), artist and musician
 Madhukar (born 1957), author, teacher and guru
 Uwe Grodd (born 1958), conductor and flutist
 Nikolai Müllerschön (born 1958), film director, producer and screenwriter
 Geoff Tate (born 1959), singer and musician
 Greg Iles (born 1960), novelist
 Claudia Neidig (born 1960), actress
 Eytan Pessen (born 1961), pianist and opera director
 Susanne Lewis (born 1962), American musician, songwriter and artist
 Alex Jolig (born 1963), actor, singer and motorcycle racer
 Angela Laich (born 1963), sculptor, draughtsperson and painter
 Steffen Lehmann (born 1963), architect and urban designer
 Denis Scheck (born 1964), literary critic and journalist
 Christian Dierstein (born 1965), percussionist and academic teacher
 Mark Landler (born 1965), journalist
 Alexander Bader (born 1965), clarinetist
 Jürgen Mayer (born 1965), architect and artist
 Judith Kaufmann (born 1962), cinematographer
 Sandra Hastenteufel (born 1966), artist
 Stefan-Peter Greiner (born 1966), violin maker
 Klaus Schedl (born 1966), composer
 Michael Beck (born 1967), member of the German hip hop group Die Fantastischen Vier
 Natalia Wörner (born 1967), actress
 Robert Schwentke (born 1968), film director
 Markus Amm (born 1969), artist
 Ulrike Frank (born 1969), actress
 Jerri Manthey (born 1970), actress
 Matthias Rexroth (born 1970), countertenor
 Thom Barron (born 1971), pornographic actor
 Chris Bosse (born 1971), architect
 Lisa Martinek (born 1972), actress
 Carmen Vincelj (born 1972), professional dancer
 Reggie Watts (born 1972), musician
 Christopher Bauder (born 1973), interaction designer and media artist
 André Butzer (born 1973), artist
 Max Herre (born 1973), musician
 Florian Maier-Aichen (born 1973), landscape photographer
 Matthias Megyeri (born 1973), designer of security products
 Marc C. Woehr (born 1973), contemporary artist 
 Melina Aslanidou (born 1974). Greek musician
 Dragan Espenschied (born 1975), media artist 
 Nina Hoss (born 1975), actress
 Martin Pfeifle (born 1975), sculptor
 Tanja Liedtke (born 1977), professional dancer
 Tanja Becker-Bender (born 1978), violinist
 Haha (born 1979), singer
 Simone Simons (born 1985), singer 
 Alexander Tuschinski (born 1988), film director
 Pia Wurtzbach (born 1989), Miss Universe 2015 for the Philippines
 Yoon So-hee (born 1993), South Korean actress
 Mailin Hübler current mayor

Athletes

 Julius Frey (1881–1960), swimmer
 Karl Burger (1883–1959), amateur football player and manager
 Fred Gaiser (1885–1918), pitcher for the St. Louis Cardinals
 Otto Merz (1889–1933), chauffeur, race car driver, test driver and mechanic
 Otto Fahr (1892–1969), backstroke swimmer
 Christian Werner (1892–1932), racecar driver
 Wolf Hirth (1900–1959), gliding pioneer and sailplane designer
 Martin Schempp (1905–1984), glider pilot
 Helmut Schäfer (1908–1994), weightlifter
 Hermann Lang (1909–1987), champion race car driver
 Erwin Bauer (1912–1958), Formula One driver
 Rudi Fischer (1912–1976), racing driver
 Hermann Pilnik (1914–1981), chess Grandmaster
 Kurt Adolff (1921–2012), racing driver
 Robert Schlienz (1924–1995), football player
 Hans Herrmann (born 1928), race car driver
 Michael May (born 1934), race car driver
 Günter Klass (1936–1967), race car driver
 Dieter Glemser (born 1938), touring car racing driver
 Marlinde Massa (1944–2014), field hockey player
 Horst Köppel (born 1948), footballer and football manager
 Hans Lutz (born 1949), track cyclist and road bicycle racer
 Rolf Ziegler (born 1951), athlete
 Harry Gauss (1952–2009), football coach
 Rainer Adrion (born 1953), footballer and football manager
 Almut Lehmann (born 1953), pair skater
 Walter Kelsch (born 1955), footballer
 Bernd Martin (born 1955), footballer
 Elmar Borrmann (born 1957), fencer
 Dominic Dobson (born 1957), CART and Craftsman Truck Series driver
 Hansi Müller (born 1957), footballer and supervisory board member of VfB Stuttgart
 Mark Adickes (born 1961), American football player
 Ed Reynolds (born 1961), American football player
 John Alt (born 1962), American football player
 Rainer Kraft (born 1962), football coach
 Andreas Müller (born 1962), football player
 Martin Schwalb (born 1963), handball player
 Beate Bühler (born 1964), volleyball player
 Jürgen Evers (born 1964), sprinter
 Anja Langer (born 1965), professional bodybuilder
 Christina Riegel (born 1965), figure skater
 Michael Spies (born 1965), footballer
 Thomas Stickroth (born 1965), footballer
 Vincenzo Nardiello (born 1966), boxer
 Dietmar Haaf (born 1967), long jumper
 Jürgen Klopp (born 1967), footballer and football manager 
 Eberhard Trautner (born 1967), footballer
 Dimitrios Moutas (born 1968), footballer
 Marco Kurz (born 1969), footballer and coach
 Bernhard Rühling (born 1969), rower
 Kim Bauermeister (born 1970), runner
 Franziska Hentschel (born 1970), field hockey player
 Jens Keller (born 1970), footballer and football manager
 Sascha Fischer (born 1971), rugby union player
 Markus Lösch (born 1971), footballer
 Tayfun Korkut (born 1974), footballer
 David Montero (born 1974), footballer
 Roberto D'Aversa (born 1975), footballer
 Roberto Pinto (born 1978), footballer
 Oliver Barth (born 1979), footballer
 Sead Ramović (born 1979), footballer
 Marc Lieb (born 1980), race car driver
 Markus Winkelhock (born 1980), racing driver
 Michael Berrer (born 1980), tennis player
 Maren Baumbach (born 1981), handball player
 Savvas Exouzidis (born 1981), footballer
 Simon Greul (born 1981), tennis player
 David Yelldell (born 1981), American footballer
 Oliver Stierle (born 1983), footballer
 Svenja Bazlen (born 1984), triathlete
 Patrick Milchraum (born 1984), footballer
 Nina Wengert (born 1984), rower
 Nadine Hildebrand (born 1987), track and field athlete
 Sami Khedira (born 1987), footballer
 Johannes Theobald (born 1987), racing driver
 Patrick Hager (born 1988), ice hockey player
 Maylin Hausch (born 1988), pair skater
 Aggelos Komvolidis (born 1988), footballer
 Julian Leist (born 1988), footballer
 Katrin Reinert (born 1988), rower
 Michael Schick (born 1988), footballer
 Kağan Söylemezgiller (born 1988), footballer
 Fernando Raposo (born 1989), basketball player
 Joselu (born 1990), footballer
 Teoman Örge (born 1990), basketball player
 Panagiotis Vlachodimos (born 1991), footballer
 Bernard Tomic (born 1992), tennis player
Timo Werner (born 1996), professional footballer

Businessman

 Salomon Idler (1610–1669), shoemaker
 Johann Friedrich Cotta (1764–1832), publisher, industrial pioneer and politician
 Robert Schlumberger von Goldeck (1814–1879), entrepreneur
 Charles Rasp (1846–1907), businessman
 Hermann Eckstein (1847–1893), magnate and banker
 Fritz Mannheimer (1890–1939), banker
 Theodor Koch (1905–1976), German engineer and weapons manufacturer
 Berthold Leibinger (1930–2018), engineer, entrepreneur and philanthropist
 Heinz Dürr (born 1933), entrepreneur and stockholder
 Ulrich Bez (born 1943), businessman
 Matthias Rath (born 1955), doctor, businessman and vitamin entrepreneur
 Dominik Brunner (1959–2009), businessman
 Martin Brudermüller (born 1961), businessman, CEO of BASF

Lawyers

Military

 Maximilian Emanuel of Württemberg-Winnental (1689–1709), volunteer soldier in the army of Charles XII of Sweden
 Jean Chrétien Fischer (1713–1762), soldier
 Rudolf Veiel (1883–1956), general
 Wilhelm Boger (1906–1977), police commissioner and concentration camp overseer
 Wilhelm Herget (1910–1974), night fighter flying ace in the Luftwaffe
 Rainer Hildebrandt (1914–2004), anti-communist resistance fighter and historian
 Helmut Belser (1915–1942), Luftwaffe ace
 Helmut Hirsch (1916–1937), student and resistance member
 Hans Götz (1919–1943), Luftwaffe ace
 Herbert Berrer (1921–1992), one man torpedo driver
 Angelika Speitel (born 1952), member of the Red Army Faction

Officers

 Henry Frederick of Württemberg-Winnental (1687–1734), general
 Frederick Louis of Württemberg-Winnental (1690–1734), army commander
 August of Württemberg (1813–1885), Royal Prussian Colonel General
 Walther Reinhardt (1872–1930), officer
 Hermann Geyer (1882–1946), General der Infanterie in the Wehrmacht during World War II
 Rudolf Veiel (1883–1956), General of the Panzertruppe during World War II
 Christian Wirth (1885–1944), Nazi SS concentration camp commander involved in the Action T4 program and Operation Reinhard
 Dietrich Kraiß (1889–1944), Generalleutnant during World War II
 Rudolf von Bünau (1890–1962), general
 Walther Fischer von Weikersthal (1890–1953), General der Infanterie in the Wehrmacht during World War II
 Albert Buck (1895–1962), Generalmajor in the Wehrmacht during World War II
 Heinrich Eberbach (1895–1992), General der Panzertruppe in World War II
 Herbert Wagner (1896–1968), Generalleutnant in the Wehrmacht during World War II
 Günther Gumprich (1900–1943), Naval captain of the Kaiserliche Marine, Reichsmarine and Kriegsmarine
 Hermann Plocher (1901–1980), Luftwaffe commander during World War II
 Herbert Kappler (1907–1978), head of German police in Rome during World War II
 Hans Endreß (1911–1969), Hauptsturmführer (Captain) in the Waffen SS
 Walter Harzer (1912–1982), Waffen-SS officer
 Rudolf Böhmler (1914–1968), Oberst in the Fallschirmjäger during World War II
 Wilhelm Spindler (1914–1997), Oberst in the Wehrmacht during World War II
 Rudolf von Bünau (1915–1943), Major in the Wehrmacht during World War II
 Heinz Haag (1918–1994), Schnellboot commander in World War II
 Günther Hilt (1918–1944), Major in the Wehrmacht during World War II
 Wilhelm Bäder (1922–1945), Oberleutnant der Reserve in the Wehrmacht during World War II

Scholars

 Georg Bernhard Bilfinger (1693–1750), philosopher, mathematician and statesman
 Johann Jakob Moser (1701–1785), jurist, publicist and researcher
 Ludwig Timotheus Spittler (1752–1810), historian
 Marianne Ehrmann (1755–1795), one of the first women novelists and publicists in the German-speaking countries
 Georg Wilhelm Friedrich Hegel (1770–1831), philosopher
 Karl Christian Planck (1819–1880), philosopher
 Rudolf von Roth (1821–1895), Indologist, founder of the Vedic philology
 Karl Mauch (1837–1875), explorer and African geographer
 Friedrich Hauser (1859–1917), archaeologist and art historian
 Hermann Abert (1871–1927), music historian
 Max Horkheimer (1895–1973), philosopher-sociologist
 Alexander Schenk Graf von Stauffenberg (1905–1964), aristocrat, historian and member of the 20 July plot
 Edward Lowinsky (1908–1985), musicologist
 Karl Dietrich Bracher (1922–2016), political scientist and historian
 Herbert E. Brekle (1935–2018), typographer and linguist
 Frieder Nake (born 1938), professor for computer graphics
 Manfred Schneckenburger (1938–2019), art historian and curator
 Gerhard Raff (born 1946), historian, editor and publisher
 John Thorn (born 1947), sports historian
 Phillip Longman (born 1956), demographer
 Claudia Schoppmann (born 1958), historian and author
 Andres Veiel (born 1959), film director and screenwriter
 Michael Maar (born 1960), literary scholar and author
 Eric Hilgendorf (born 1960), professor of law
 Ralf Zerback (born 1961), historian and author

Scientists

 Johann Friedrich Pfaff (1765–1825), mathematician
 Andreas Friedrich Bauer (1783–1860), engineer
 Carl Reichenbach (1788–1869), chemist, geologist, metallurgist, naturalist, industrialist and philosopher
 Christian Heinrich von Nagel (1803–1882), geometer
 Friedrich August von Alberti (1795–1878), geologist
 Hugo von Mohl (1805–1872), botanist
 Karl Friedrich Wilhelm Berge (1811–1883), naturalist, ornithologist and entomologist
 Christian Ferdinand Friedrich Krauss (1812–1890), scientist, traveler and collector
 Johann Ludwig Karl Heinrich von Struve (1812–1898), astronomer
 Wilhelm Griesinger (1817–1868), neurologist and psychiatrist
 Wilhelm Roser (1817–1888), surgeon and ophthalmologist
 Carl Gustav Guckelberger (1820–1902), chemist
 Carl Gustav Calwer (1821–1874), entomologist
 Christian Zeller (1822–1899), mathematician
 Carl Wilhelm Heine (1838–1877), physician
 Wilhelm Camerer (1842–1910), physician
 Eugen Baumann (1846–1896), chemist
 Carl Magnus von Hell (1849–1926), chemist
 Otto Hölder (1859–1937), mathematician
 Wilhelm Weinberg (1862–1937), physician and obstetrician-gynecologist
 Hans Spemann (1869–1941), embryologist
 Friedrich Wilhelm Seiffer (1872–?), neurologist and psychiatrist
 Viktor von Weizsäcker (1886–1957), physician and physiologist
 Erich Huzenlaub (1888–1964), chemist
 Erich Schönhardt (1891–1979), mathematician
 Erwin Fues (1893–1970), physicist
 Paul Schlack (1897–1967), chemist
 Ernst Rexer (1902–1983), nuclear physicist
 Erich Zürn (1906–1965), U-boat engineer
 Fritz Leonhardt (1909–1999), structural engineer
 Karl Steinbuch (1917–2005), computer scientist, cyberneticist and electrical engineer
 Franz Sondheimer (1926–1981), chemist
 Rolf Landauer (1927–1999), physicist
 Hans-Peter Dürr (1929–2014), physicist
 Gerhard Ertl (born 1936), physicist
 Hartmut Elsenhans (born 1941), scientist
 Ulf Dietrich Merbold (born 1941), astronaut
 Knut Urban (born 1941), physicist
 Bert Sakmann (born 1942), cell physiologist
 Hans-Jörg Bullinger (born 1944), scientist
 Bernhard Mann (born 1950), social scientist
 David Robert Nelson (born 1951), physicist
 Rudi Studer (born 1951), computer scientist
 Rolf Schlierer (born 1955), physician, lawyer and politician
 Ulf Hohmann (born 1963), ethologist
 Christof Ebert (born 1964), computer scientist and author
 Gert Mittring (born 1966), mental calculator
 Patrick Cramer (born 1969), biochemist
 Shuman Ghosemajumder (born 1974), Canadian technologist, entrepreneur, and author
 Martin Reimann (born 1978), researcher

Statesmen

 Eberhard I (1265–1325), Count of Württemberg
 Eberhard IV (1388–1419), Count of Württemberg
 Eberhard III (1614–1674), Duke of Württemberg
 Frederick (1615–1682), Duke of Württemberg
 William Louis (1647–1677), Duke of Württemberg
 Eberhard Louis (1676–1733), Duke of Württemberg
 Magdalena Wilhelmine of Württemberg (1677–1742), Margravine of Baden
 Charles Alexander of Württemberg (1684–1737), Duke of Württemberg
 Frederick II Eugene of Württemberg (1732–1797), Duke of Württemberg
 Auguste of Württemberg (1734–1787), Duchess of Württemberg
 Wilhelm of Urach (1810–1869), Duke of Urach
 Sophie of Württemberg (1818–1877), Queen of the Netherlands
 Charles I (1823–1891), King of Württemberg
 William II of Württemberg (1848–1921), King of Württemberg
 Christopher Gustavus Memminger (1803–1888), 1st C.S. Secretary of the Treasury
 Karl von Weizsäcker (1853–1926), politician
 Ernst von Weizsäcker (1882–1951), diplomat and politician
 Maria Walter (1895–1988), politician
 Heinrich Rau (1899–1961), politician
 Richard von Weizsäcker (1920–2015), politician and former President of Germany
 Kurt Gscheidle (1924–2003), politician
 Werner Ungerer (1927–2014), diplomat and civil servant
 Manfred Rommel (1928–2013), politician
 Manfred Abelein (1930–2008), politician
 Manfred Wörner (1934–1994), politician and diplomat
 Kurt Joachim Lauk (born 1946), politician
 Christel Haeck (born 1948), politician
 Rainer Arnold (born 1950), politician
 Günther Oettinger (born 1953), politician
 Jörg Tauss (born 1953), politician
 Constanze Angela Krehl (born 1956), politician
 Karin Binder (born 1957), politician
 Rainer Wieland (born 1957), politician
 Eric Abetz (born 1958), politician
 Axel Berg (born 1959), politician
 Volker Beck (born 1960), politician
 Tobias Pflüger (born 1965), politician
 Stefan Kaufmann (born 1969), politician
 Christian von Stetten (born 1970), businessman and politician

Royalty and nobility

 Anna of Württemberg (1561–1616), Princess of Württemberg
 Pauline of Württemberg (1810–1856), Princess of Württemberg
 Catherine of Württemberg (1821–1898), Princess of Württemberg
 Pauline of Saxe-Weimar-Eisenach (1852–1904), Princess of Saxe-Weimar-Eisenach
 Pauline of Württemberg (1877–1965), Princess of Württemberg
 Philipp Albrecht (1893–1975), member of the House of Württemberg
 Carl Alexander (1896–1964), member of the House of Württemberg

Theologians

Notable residents of Stuttgart

 Charles Eugene, Duke of Württemberg (1728–1793), son of Duke Karl I Alexander
 Friedrich Schiller (1759–1805), poet, philosopher, historian, and playwright
 Christian Ferdinand Friedrich Hochstetter (1787–1860), botanist and Protestant minister
 Friedrich Ruthardt (1802–1862), oboist and composer
 Charlotte Wahl (1817–1899), philanthropist
 Gottlieb Daimler (1834–1900), engineer, industrial designer and industrialist
 Dionys Pruckner (1834–1896), pianist and music teacher
 Wilhelm Maybach (1846–1929), designer and industrialist
 Anton Schott (1846–1913), German dramatic tenor
 Robert Bosch (1861–1942), industrialist, engineer and inventor
 Carl Eytel (1862–1925), German-American artist who studied at the Royal Art School before emigrating to America and settling in Palm Springs, California
 Ferdinand Porsche (1875–1951), automotive engineer
 Paul Bonatz (1877–1956), architect
 Wilhelm Steinkopf (1879–1949), chemist
 Theodor Heuss (1884–1963), politician
 Claus von Stauffenberg (1907–1944), army officer and Catholic aristocrat
 Günter Behnisch (1922–2010), architect
 Albrecht Roser (1922–2011), master puppeteer
 Frei Otto (1925–2015), architect and structural engineer
 Klaus von Klitzing (born 1943), physicist
 Fred Breinersdorfer (born 1946), screenwriter, producer and film director
 Norbert Haug (born 1952), journalist
 Jürgen Klinsmann (born 1964), footballer and coach
 Frank Karlitschek (born 1973), open source software developer
 Dragan Espenschied (born 1975), 8-bit musician and media artist
 Katja Mragowska (born 1975), artist
 Sascha Gerstner (born 1977), musician and photographer
 Louk Sorensen (born 1985), Irish tennis player
 Alexander Tuschinski (born 1988), film director
 Pia Wurtzbach (born 1989), Miss Universe 2015
 Fernando Raposo (born 1989), French basketball player
 Yoon So-hee (born 1993), South Korean actress
 Irmgard Schwebler (born 1931), American diplomat
 Mirko McClammy (born 1964), Barrister

References

 list
Stuttgart
History of Stuttgart
Stuttgart people